Perseverance was built in 1797 at Stettin or Sweden and came into British hands in 1799. She made one voyage under charter to the British East India Company (EIC), and was lost in July 1803.

Career
Perseverance was built either in Stettin, then part of Prussia, or Sweden. One source states the Prinsep and Saunders purchased her, but she first appears in Lloyd's Register with Ord, master, and Herbert, owner. Her trade is London—Demerara.

Lloyd's Register for 1801 gives her master as Dorwick, her owner as Woods & Co., and her trade as London—Bengal. Perseverance sailed from Portsmouth on 9 January 1801. Messrs. Princip and Saunders had tendered Perseverance, Nathaniel Downick, master, to the EIC to bring back rice from Bengal. She was one of 28 vessels that sailed on that mission between December 1800 and February 1801.

 

She arrived at Calcutta on 24 May. Homeward bound, she reached St Helena on 31 December, and arrived at the Downs on 21 February 1802.

On her return Captain Dorwick, or Downick, purchased her, though the Register of Shipping shows her owner as Dixon & Co. Under Captain J. Goodwin she then sailed to Honduras. In 1803 she was under the command of Stevenson, with Dorwick, owner, and trade London—Memel.

Fate
Lloyd's List reported on 19 July 1803 that Perseverance had been wrecked on the Memel Bar in the Baltic Sea during voyage from Memel to London.

Citations and references
Citations

References
 
Hardy, Charles (1800) A Register of Ships, Employed in the Service of the Hon. the United East India Company, from the Union of the Two Companies, in 1707, to the Year 1760: Specifying the Number of Voyages, Tonnage, Commanders, and Stations. To which is Added, from the Latter Period to the Present Time, the Managing Owners, Principal Officers, Surgeons, and Pursers; with the Dates of Their Sailing and Arrival: Also, an Appendix, Containing Many Particulars, Interesting to Those Concerned in the East India Commerce. (Charles Hardy)

1797 ships
Ships built in Stettin
Ships built in Sweden
Ships of the British East India Company
Maritime incidents in 1803
Age of Sail merchant ships
Merchant ships of the United Kingdom
Shipwrecks in the Baltic Sea